The Sarikoli language (also Sariqoli, Selekur, Sarikul, Sariqul, Sariköli) is a member of the Pamir subgroup of the Southeastern Iranian languages spoken by Sarikoli Pamiri people. It is officially referred to in China as the "Tajik language", although it is different from the related Iranian language spoken in Tajikistan, which is considered a dialect of Persian.

Nomenclature
Sarikoli is officially referred to as "Tajik" (Tǎjíkèyǔ) in China. However, it is not closely related to Tajik (a form of Persian) as spoken in Tajikistan because Sarikoli is an Eastern Iranian language, closely related to other Pamir languages largely spoken in the Badakshan regions of Tajikistan and Afghanistan, whereas the Western Iranian Farsi-Dari-Tajik is a polycentric language of a related but distinctly and historically different type. Both of these types of language and dialect clusters have been geographically separated by great distances and mountainous terrain over the course of long periods of time during which many differences of pronunciation, wording and xenolinguistic borrowings or retention of older forms or word choices accumulated over time. It is also referred to as Tashkorghani, after the ancient capital of the Sarikoli kingdom -- now the Tashkurgan (or Taxkorgan) Tajik Autonomous County in Xinjiang, China. However, the usage of the term Tashkorghani is not widespread among scholars.

The earliest written accounts in English are from the 1870s which generally use the name "Sarikoli" to refer to the language, but some written accounts since that time may use a different pronunciation derived from transcribing Chinese phonetics of the term into English as "Selekur(i)". Modern Chinese researchers often mention Sarikoli and Tajik names in their papers.

Distribution of speakers

The number of speakers is around 35,000; most reside in the Taxkorgan Tajik Autonomous County in Southern Xinjiang Province, China. The Chinese name for the Sarikoli language, as well as the usage of Sarikol as a toponym, is Sàléikuòlèyǔ. Speakers in China typically use Chinese and Uyghur to communicate with people of other ethnic groups in the area. The rest are found in the Pakistani-controlled sector of Kashmir, closely touching the Pakistan-Chinese international borders.

Writing system
The language has no official written form. Linguist Gāo Èrqiāng, publishing in China, used IPA to transcribe the sounds of Sarikoli in his book and dictionary, while Tatiana N. Pakhalina, publishing in Russia, used an alphabet similar to that of the Wakhi language in hers. The majority of Sarikoli-speakers attend schools using Uyghur as the medium of instruction.

In academia
In 1958, linguist Gāo Èrqiāng studied Sarikoli in collaboration with Tajik linguists, using 37 symbols from the International Phonetic Alphabet for the transcription of the language. In the 1996 Sarikoli–Han dictionary, Gāo Èrqiāng uses an alphabet of 26 letters and 8 digraphs based on Pinyin.

Uyghur Alphabet

In recent years, Sarikoli speakers in China have used Uyghur Arabic alphabet to spell out their language.

Phonology

Vowels

// may also be heard as [, ].

Sarikoli vowels as used in Russian works (IPA values in brackets):

 In some dialects also long variants of those vowels can appear: ā, ē, ī, ō, ū, ы̄, ǝ̄. (citation?)

Consonants
Sarikoli has 30 consonants:

Sarikoli consonants according to Russian Iranologist transcription (IPA values in slashes): p , b , t , d , k , g , q , c , ʒ , č , ǰ , s , z , x̌ , γ̌ , f , v , θ , δ , x , γ , š , ž , h , w , y , m , n , l , r

Stress
Most words receive stress on the last syllable; however, a minority receive stress on their first syllable. Also, several noun declensions and verb inflections regularly place stress on their first syllable, including the imperative and interrogative.

Vocabulary
Although to a large extent the Sarikoli lexicon is quite close to those of other Eastern Iranian languages, there are a large number are words unique to Sarikoli and the closely related Shughni that are not found in other Eastern Iranian languages like Wakhi, Pashto or Avestan.

References

Further reading

External links
The Tajik Ethnic Group in China

Pamir languages
Eastern Iranian languages
Languages of China
Endangered Iranian languages
Tajiks of Xinjiang